Hell & Heaven is an annual Brazilian LGBT event, the first edition occurred in 2009. The location of the event used to be a beach resort next to the town of Mata de São João, Sauípe Coast, State of Bahia, Northeastern Brazil between 2009 and 2011. In 2012 to present the event is held in Guarajuba in Vila Galé Resort. The Green Line Highway connects Guarajuba with Salvador and Salvador International Airport.

Hell & Heaven is a unique event where participants from Brazil and all over the world get together in three themed parties. International DJs from the electronic scene line up at the first event of this kind especially LGBT oriented, taking place in the major hotel complex of Latin America.

Diverse holiday package options are offered between two and eight nights in single, double, or triple rooms. All packages include internal transportation at Sauípe Coast, special H&H welcome kit, tickets to all parties, access to all the amenities and entertainment of Sauípe, and diverse free food. The resort's area is of 170 hectares (420 acres), the nicknames are "piece of the heaven" and "brazilian cancun."

The Costa do Sauípe complex has five big hotels, with five stars: Costa do Sauípe All Inclusive, Costa do Sauípe Grande Hotel, Costa do Sauípe Golf & Spa, Costa do Sauípe Suites, and SuperClubs Breezes.

Located at the border of the sea features more than 1500, sports center with golf center, tennis courses, a nautical center and horseback riding. Cuisine that fits the most demanding tastes is served restaurants that feature the best of Brazilian, French, Italian, and Japanese delicacies. Who offer the same all-inclusive packages that have brought them success in the Caribbean.

However, the area has many options of hotels, hostels and "pousadas" (small hotel). New Village of the Beach "Vila Nova da Praia" is an important shopping area in Sauípe region.

The area referred like Coast of the coconut palms "Costa dos Coqueirais" has capacity over 4,000 persons. The resort is one of the best in Brazil. With eighteen restaurants, eighteen swimming pools and aquatic complex, five sport centers, one golf club, and 6 km (3.7 mi) of tropical beaches. In 2008, the sunshine state of Bahia received 180,000 foreigners, the largest number in the Northeastern Brazil.

Hell & Heaven is the first LGBT festival of electronic music of Costa do Sauípe resort. The resort has fame of carry out big events. In 2008, received 34 presidents of Latin American countries, including Luiz Inácio Lula da Silva, Raúl Castro, and Hugo Chávez. The other event is Sauípe Folia, a festival of brazilian music, including important singers such as Ivete Sangalo.

Many cities across Brazil (such as: São Paulo, Rio de Janeiro, Salvador, Recife, Belo Horizonte, Curitiba, Florianópolis, and others) and the world (such as: Buenos Aires, Cambridge, Los Angeles, Miami, Minneapolis, New York, and Washington) are the starting point for those who want to enjoy the first electronic festival specially LGBT oriented in a luxury resort.

Hell & Heaven has national and regional partners with the biggest gay nightclubs of Brazil, such as Flexx Club in São Paulo; San Sebastian Salvador and Off Club in Salvador; Josefine Club in Belo Horizonte; Metrópole in Recife; Divino Lounge Bar in Campinas; Jivago Lounge in Florianópolis.

The international partners are two from Argentina, Friendly Apartments and Rheo by Crobar. And five from the United States, White Party Week, Masterbeat, Winter Party Festival, Atlantis Events, and National Gay and Lesbian Task Force Foundation. The sponsors of Hell & Heaven are Aussiebum from Australia, and Skyy vodka from the U.S. State of California.

See also

 List of LGBT events
 LGBT rights in Brazil
 LGBT rights in the World

References

External links
 Hell & Heaven - Official website 
 Hell & Heaven - Official video 
 Costa do Sauípe - Official website 

LGBT events in Brazil
Electronic music festivals in Brazil
Cultural festivals in Brazil